Pěnčín is a municipality and village in Jablonec nad Nisou District in the Liberec Region of the Czech Republic. It has about 2,000 inhabitants.

Administrative parts
Villages of Alšovice, Bratříkov, Dolní Černá Studnice, Huť, Jistebsko and Krásná are administrative parts of Pěnčín.

References

Villages in Jablonec nad Nisou District